Roser or Röser is a name of German origin. It may be related to the French Rosier.

People with the given name
 Roser (singer) (born 1979), Spanish singer
 Roser Aguilar (born 1971), Spanish film director and screenwriter
 Roser Amadó (born 1944), Spanish architect
 Roser Bastida Areny (born 1955), Andorran politician
 Roser Bru (1923–2021), Spanish-Chilean painter and engraver
 Roser Caminals-Heath, Spanish author and professor
 Roser Serra (born 1971), Spanish footballer
 Roser Tarragó (born 1993), Spanish water polo player
 Roser Vives (born 1984), Spanish swimmer
 Roser Johnson (born 1989), One Vegan Boii

People with the surname
 Albrecht Roser (1922–2011), German puppeteer
 Bunny Roser (1901–1979), American baseball player
 Ce Roser (born 1930), American artist
 Charles Roser (1864–1937, American businessman and philanthropist
 Isabella Roser (fl. 1520–1547), Spanish noblewoman
 Lucas Röser (born 1993), German footballer
 Mario Röser (born 1966), German footballer
 Martin Röser (born 1990), German footballer
 Max Roser, German-British economist and media critic
 Natalie Roser, Australian model
 Steve Roser (1918–2002), American baseball player
 Uroš Rošer (born 1986), Slovenian footballer
 Wilhelm Roser (1817–1888), German surgeon and ophthalmologist

See also
 Rose (given name)
 Rose (surname)

References

German-language surnames